William Lindsay FRSE SSC (24 November 1819 - 20 February 1884) was a Scottish shipowner who served as Provost of Leith from 1860 to 1866. Lindsay Road in Edinburgh is named after him.

As a lawyer he was responsible from framing the General Police and Improvement Act (Scotland) of 1869 which was known as the Lindsay Act.

Life

He was born in 1819 on Coburg Street in North Leith. He was the son of Captain James Lindsay (d.1839), a shipmaster, and his wife, Helen Allan of Alloa.

He was apprenticed to Alexander Simson SSC nearby, at 38 Bernard Street as a solicitor.

In 1860 he became Provost and Chief Magistrate of Leith and organised the remodelling of Leith Town Hall to accommodate a new court room and prison (still extant) and absorb a line of Georgian houses to the east to create Leith Police Station.

In 1864 he was elected a Fellow of the Royal Society of Edinburgh his proposer being Thomas Williamson.
From 1864 until death he left the legal world and started a local shipping company, owning several ships.

In 1875, he was living at Hermitage Hill in Leith, a large Georgian villa south of Leith Links.

He died on 20 February 1884. A memorial was erected to his memory in the south aisle of South Leith Parish Church.

Family
He was married to Mary Weatherstone Bruce (d.1881). They had three children: James William (b. 1849), Mary Weatherstone (b. 1851), and William Walter (b. 1854).

He was grandfather to Charles Augustus Carlow FRSE, the son of his daughter, Mary Weatherstone Lindsay (1851-1929).

Artistic Recognition
His portrait by John Horsburgh is held by the City of Edinburgh Council at Leith Town Hall (now Leith Police station) along with a marble bust of him.

References

1819 births
1884 deaths
Fellows of the Royal Society of Edinburgh
People from Leith
Ship owners
Lawyers from Edinburgh